Lettuces (Lactuca species) are used as food plants by the larvae of a number of Lepidoptera species including:

Angle shades (Phlogophora meticulosa)
Autumnal rustic (Eugnorisma glareosa)
Cabbage moth (Mamestra brassicae)
Common swift (Korscheltellus lupulina)
Garden dart (Euxoa nigricans)
Ghost moth (Hepialus humuli)
Gothic (Naenia typica)
Grey chi (Antitype chi)
Heart and club (Agrotis clavis)
Heart and dart (Agrotis exclamationis)
Ingrailed clay (Diarsia mendica)
Large yellow underwing (Noctua pronuba)
Nutmeg (Discestra trifolii)
Setaceous Hebrew character (Xestia c-nigrum)
Shark (Cucullia umbratica)
Small angle shades (Euplexia lucipara)
Turnip moth (Agrotis segetum)

External links

lettuce
Lactuca